Zoe Thompson (born 16 September 1983) is an association football player who represented New Zealand at international level. She attended Takapuna Grammar School and was Deputy Head Girl in her last year, 2001. She currently plays for Glenfield Rovers.

Thompson made her Football Ferns debut as a substitute in a 0–3 loss to China on 22 February 2004, and represented New Zealand at the 2007 FIFA Women's World Cup finals in China, where they lost to Brazil 0–5, Denmark (0-2) and China (0-2).

References

External links

1983 births
Living people
New Zealand women's association footballers
New Zealand women's international footballers
Women's association football forwards
2007 FIFA Women's World Cup players